Steve Hirschi (born 18 September 1981 in Grosshöchstetten, Switzerland) is a Swiss former professional ice hockey Defenseman who most notably played for as Captain of HC Lugano in the National League A (NLA).

Playing career 
Hirschi played with SC Langnau until 2003 and then signed with fellow NLA club HC Lugano. He won the Swiss national championship with HCL in 2006 and later served as team captain.

He announced on February 23, 2017, that he will retire at the end of the 2016-17 season to begin his coaching career in HC Lugano's youth ranks.

International play
He participated at the 2006 Olympic Games as well as at the 2007 and 2010 IIHF World Championship as a member of the Switzerland men's national ice hockey team.

Personal
Hirschi practises a vegan lifestyle.

Career statistics

Regular season and playoffs

International

References

External links

1981 births
Living people
HC Lugano players
Ice hockey players at the 2006 Winter Olympics
Olympic ice hockey players of Switzerland
SCL Tigers players
Swiss ice hockey defencemen